"Angel" is a song by Cuban-American recording artist Jon Secada from his first studio album, Jon Secada, and his first Spanish-language album, Otro Día Más Sin Verte (1992). It was released in 1993 as the second single from Jon Secada and from his Spanish-language album. The English version peaked at number 18 on the US Billboard Hot 100 and at number three on the US Billboard Hot Adult Contemporary chart. The Spanish version peaked at number one on the US Billboard Hot Latin Tracks chart. It was composed by Secada and Miguel A. Morejon, and Emilio Estefan Jr. produced the piece. "Angel" is a rock ballad and was nominated for Pop Song of the Year at the 1993 Premio Lo Nuestro Awards. The song was the ninth best-performing Latin single on the Billboard Hot Latin Tracks chart of 1992.

Production and success 
Secada was the backing vocalist for the Cuban singer Gloria Estefan in 1989. Secada became close friends with Estefan and her husband, Emilio Estefan Jr., who helped to guide Secada into the music business. Secada released his first album, Jon Secada in 1992 with SBK Records. The recording was made up of English-language compositions and two Spanish-language tracks. It was certified triple platinum by the Recording Industry Association of America (RIAA), denoting shipments of three million copies. Secada, with the help of Emilio, decided to release an all Spanish-language album. During the recording sessions, Secada confirmed that Gloria helped to translate his English-language recordings into Spanish. He said that she told him to record songs which he would be comfortably fine with singing throughout his career as a singer. She also told them not to "translate everything literally" but to "keep the same theme of the song in play". "Angel" was written about a woman Secada had met in Amsterdam. He wrote in his autobiography that "writing those songs crystallized for me the fact that I was missing out on a deep emotional connection."

"Angel" was released as the second single from his Spanish album. It peaked at number one on the US Billboard Hot Latin Tracks chart on the week ending October 31, 1992. John Lannert of Billboard called "Angel" a "dramatic love ode". Carlos Bolívar Ramírez described the singles "Otro Día Más Sin Verte" and "Angel" as rock ballads in his book La balada: mensaje universal (2001). "Angel" was nominated for Pop Song of the Year at the 1993 Premio Lo Nuestro Awards. "Angel" was the ninth best-performing Latin single on the Hot Latin Tracks year-end chart in 1992.

Credits and personnel 
Credits are taken from the album's liner notes.
 Jon Secada – vocals, composition
 Miguel A. Morejon – composition
 Emilio Estefan Jr. – production

Charts

Weekly charts

English version

Spanish version

Year-end charts

References

Sources
 
 
 

1990s ballads
1992 songs
1993 singles
EMI Latin singles
Jon Secada songs
Rock ballads
SBK Records singles
Song recordings produced by Emilio Estefan
Songs written by Jon Secada
Songs written by Gloria Estefan
Spanish-language songs